Pustularia bistrinotata is a species of sea snail, a cowry, a marine gastropod mollusk in the family Cypraeidae, the cowries.

Subspecies
Pustularia bistrinotata bistrinotata Schilder, F.A. & M. Schilder, 1937 Twice-triple-spotted cowry
Pustularia bistrinotata excelsior F. Lorenz, 2014
Pustularia bistrinotata ginoi F. Lorenz, 2014
Pustularia bistrinotata jandeprezi Poppe, G.T. & P. Martin, 1997
Pustularia bistrinotata keelingensis Schilder, F.A. & M. Schilder, 1940
Pustularia bistrinotata mediocris Schilder, F.A. & M. Schilder, 1938 Mediocre bistrinotata
Pustularia bistrinotata sublaevis Schilder, F.A. & M. Schilder, 1938 Almost smooth bistrinotata

Description
 This small species rarely exceed  of length. The shape is globular and the basic colour is reddish, with darker small spots.

Distribution

This species is distributed in the seas along Aldabra, Chagos, Kenya, the Mascarene Basin, Mauritius, the Red Sea, Réunion, the Seychelles and Tanzania.

References

Cypraeidae
Gastropods described in 1937